Eurnekian is a surname. Notable people with the surname include: 

Eduardo Eurnekian (born 1932), Argentine billionaire businessman of Armenian descent
Eurnekian School, school in Armenia financed by Eduardo